Dr. C. Sylendra Babu (born 5 June 1962) is a 1987 batch Indian Police Service Officer serving as the current Director General of Police and Head of Police Force, Tamil Nadu Police. He holds a PhD degree in Criminology from the University of Madras.

Early life and education
Sylendra Babu was born in the town of Kuzhithurai, Kanniyakumari District, Tamil Nadu. He attended the Govt Higher Secondary School, Vilavancode, Kanyakumari District. He has BSc (Agriculture)  from the Agricultural College and Research Institute, Madurai and majored in agriculture extension from the Tamil Nadu Agricultural University, Coimbatore. Later, he obtained BGL and MA degrees in Population Studies from the Annamalai University and was awarded a PhD for his thesis on "missing children" by the University of Madras. In 2013, he obtained a Master of Business Administration degree in Human Resources.

Personal life
Babu is known to follow a strict training regimen and has written a Tamil book on Physical fitness. He has actively participated in and supported various sport activities such as swimming, athletics, shooting, and cycling. During the course of his police training, he was awarded the RD Singh Cup for Swimming at the National Police Academy, Hyderabad. In December, 2004 he represented India for the 100 metres event in the Asian Masters Athletic Championships, Bangkok. He has also participated in several 10k runs such as the Chennai Marathon and the Coimbatore Marathon. He led a contingent of 26 marine commandos for the Half Marathon event in the 2014 Auroville Marathon.

On 8 February 2013, Babu organised and participated in an 890 km cycle rally from Chennai to Kanyakumari along with the members of Coastal Security Group and Indian Coast Guard. The rally was over a period of 10 days and aimed at creating awareness about the functioning of Coastal police and the Coast Guard among coastal residents. Being an ardent shooter, he has also participated in various police and civilian shooting competitions.

Police career
Babu joined the Indian Police Service (IPS) as a member of the 1987 batch. He was trained at the National Police Academy, Hyderabad. He has served as the Assistant Superintendent of Police (ASP), in Dharmapuri, Gobichettipalayam, Salem and Dindigul and as the Superintendent of Police (SP), in Chengalpattu, Sivagangai, Cuddalore and Kancheepuram districts and as the Deputy Commissioner of Police, Adayar-Chennai. He has also served as the Deputy Inspector-General (DIG) of Police of Viluppuram Range and as the Joint Commissioner of Police, Chennai. Later, he became the DIG of Police, Tiruchirapalli before becoming the Chief Vigilance Officer in Karur, served as Commissioner of Police, Coimbatore prior to becoming Inspector-General (IG) for Northern Zone, Chennai.

In April 2012, he was promoted to the rank of Additional Director-General of Police (ADGP) of Prisons, Tamil Nadu. Later, he was appointed the ADGP of Coastal Police and then appointed as the ADGP of Railway Police. In March 2019, he was promoted as the Director General of Police (DGP) of Railway Police.

During his tenure as the commissioner of Coimbatore city, he introduced computer literacy program in various schools in association with Lead India 2020. The schools are also adopted by the local police station under the program. He has organised free karate camps for children from the poor economic section. He has also initiated karate camps in various women's colleges.

On June 30, 2021, he took charge as DGP of Tamil Nadu Police .

Ranks held

Awards and honours
Special Task Force bravery medal upon death of the forest bandit Veerappan in 2004, for leading operations against him as the Assistant Superintendent of Police of Gobichettipalayam in 1989
President's Medal for Meritorious Service in 2005
Blue Cross of India 2007 Award presented by Menaka Gandhi, President of the People for Animals in Chennai, for implementing effective preventive measures against animal cruelty
The Best Alumnus Award presented by then Governor of Tamil Nadu, Surjit Singh Barnala in the Annual Convocation function held at the Tamil Nadu Agricultural University, Coimbatore on 25 July 2008, to felicitate 15 years of motivating Civil Service aspirants
President's Police Medal for Distinguished Service 26 January 2013
Chief Minister's Medal for excellence in public service 15 Aug 2019

Sports
Babu was manager of the Indian national athletic team in various events. He held this role for the 2002 Asian Athletics Championships – Colombo, Sri Lanka, the 2003 World Championships in Athletics – Paris, France and the 2007 World Championships in Athletics – Osaka, Japan. He was also appointed an observer of the Indian athletics contingent for the 2008 Summer Olympics, Beijing.

Babu was the president of the Throwball Federation of India, Tamil Nadu and also the vice-president of the Tamil Nadu Athletic Association. During his tenure as the president of the Coimbatore Rifle Club, from February 2010 to June 2011, he took the initiative to open rifle clubs in various schools across Tamil Nadu.

While serving as the ADGP coastal security group, Babu cycled from Chennai to Kanyakumari - which is approximately 700 km. In 2017, he was a member of a cycling expedition from Kashmir to Kanyakumari covering 4,500 km in 32 days. Babu is a Super Randonneur, having completed 600 km bicycle ride between Chennai to Rameshwaram in 36 hours.

In March 2018, Babu lead a team of 9 Coastal Police Officers and swam 18 nautical miles across the Palk Strait (Thalaimannar, Sri Lanka to Dhanushkodi) in 12 hours.

Books
 You Too Can Become an I.P.S. Officer (2008) 
 Neengalum IPS Adigaari Aagalam (2008)
 Boys & Girls - Be Ambitious (2009) 
 Principles of Success in Interview (2009)
 A Guide to Health & Happiness (2012)
 Sathikka Asaippadu (2014)
 Udalinai Urithi Sei (2015)
 Avarkalal Mudiyum Endral Nammalum Mudiyum (2016)
 Americavil 24 Naatkal
 Ungalukana 24 por vidhigal (2017)
 Unakkul oru Thalaivan (2017)
 Sinthiththa Velaiyil (2018)

References

People from Kanyakumari district
Indian Police Service officers
Living people
1962 births
Tamil Nadu Agricultural University alumni
Annamalai University alumni
University of Madras alumni